Kurt Clemens (7 November 1925 – 19 July 2021) was a German footballer who played for the Saarland national team. He turned 95 in November 2020 and died in July 2021.

References

External links

International appearances at RSSSF

1925 births
2021 deaths
People from Homburg, Saarland
Saar footballers
German footballers
Footballers from Saarland
Association football midfielders
Saarland international footballers
FC 08 Homburg players
Karlsruher SC players
1. FC Saarbrücken players
FC Nancy players
Ligue 1 players
SV Saar 05 Saarbrücken players
German expatriate footballers
German expatriate sportspeople in France
Expatriate footballers in France